Kunnas is a surname of Finnish/Estonian origin and may refer to:

Hanna-Helena Kunnas (born 1880), Finnish writer and translator
Kaj Kunnas (born 1963), Finnish sportswriter
Kirsi Kunnas (1924–2021), Finnish author and translator.
Leo Kunnas (born 1967), Estonian writer and military officer
Mauri Kunnas (born 1950), Finnish cartoonist and writer
Sylvi Kunnas (1903–1971), Finnish painting artist
Väinö Kunnas (1896–1929), Finnish painting artist

Finnish-language surnames
Surnames of Finnish origin